The 2022-23 Tulsa Golden Hurricane men's basketball team represented the University of Tulsa during the 2022–23 NCAA Division I men's basketball season. The Golden Hurricane, led by first-year head coach Eric Konkol, played their home games at the Reynolds Center in Tulsa, Oklahoma as members of the American Athletic Conference.

Previous season
The Golden Hurricane finished the 2021–22 season 11–20, 4–14 in AAC play to finish in 10th place. They defeated Wichita State in the first round of the AAC tournament before losing to SMU in the second round.

Offseason
On March 12, 2022, head coach Frank Haith resigned. On March 22, the school named Louisiana Tech head coach Eric Konkol the team's new head coach.

Departures

Incoming transfers

Recruiting classes

2022 recruiting class

Roster

Schedule and results

|-
!colspan=12 style=| Non-conference regular season

|-
!colspan=12 style=| AAC regular season

|-
!colspan=12 style=| AAC tournament

Source

References

Tulsa Golden Hurricane men's basketball seasons
Tulsa
Tulsa Golden Hurricane men's basketball
Tulsa Golden Hurricane men's basketball